Hoseyn Rostam (also Romanized as Ḩoseyn Rostam; also known as Kalāteh-ye Ḩoseyn Rostam) is a village in Meyghan Rural District, in the Central District of Nehbandan County, South Khorasan Province, Iran. At the 2006 census, its population was 34, in 9 families.

References 

Populated places in Nehbandan County